A demolition vehicle is a vehicle used to demolish buildings and other structures.

Military forces require such vehicles to clear obstacles, fortifications and rubble so that they can safely advance.  Military engineers may use a variety of specialised vehicles including armoured bulldozers and explosive robotic drones.  Examples used during the Second World War include the German Goliath, the AVRE variant of the Churchill tank and the Centaur bulldozer.  The Israel Defence Forces developed armoured bulldozers such as the IDF Caterpillar D9 in the 1950s and has used these with success in several of its conflicts.

Specialist demolition vehicles may be used by civilian contractors.  Volvo produce a range of tracked vehicles equipped with lengthy hydraulic arms and a variety of attachments including drills, grabs, pincers and scoops.

See also
Demolition belt

References

Military engineering vehicles